The Play of the Week is an American anthology series of televised stage plays which aired in NTA Film Network syndication from October 12, 1959 to May 1, 1961.

Ambitious undertaking
The series presented 67 (35 in the first season, 32 in the second) videotaped Broadway-style productions, broadcast nightly and Sunday afternoons on NTA-owned independent station WNTA-TV (now WNET) in New York City, and syndicated to approximately 100 other NTA Film Network-affiliated stations.  Because well-known performers were willing to accept minimum payments (top salary was $750) for the prestige of appearing in the critically praised showcase, production costs were kept to an average of $40,000.  Although the budget was low, the show had a high distinction which, combined with its reputation as an innovative production, gave it momentum and propelled it into winning a Peabody Award.

Episodes

Season 1 (1959–60)
{| class="wikitable"
|-
! First aired
! #
! Title
! AuthorAdaptation
! Producer
! Director
! NotesCast
|-
| Oct121959
| 1x01
| Medea
| Euripidestranslated byRobinson Jeffers
| David Susskind
| H. Wesley KenneyandJosé Quintero
| [In order of appearance] Judith Anderson as Medea (1947–48 and 1949 Broadway cast), Henry Brandon as Jason (1949 Broadway cast), Aline MacMahon as Nurse, Jacqueline Brookes as Attendant to Medea, Eric Berry as Aegeus, Colleen Dewhurst as Second Woman of Corinth, Morris Carnovsky as Creon, Michael Wager as Jason's Slave, Mannie Sloane as Child, Rickey Sloane as Child, Don McHenry as Tutor (1947–48, 1949 and 1982 Broadway cast), Betty Miller as First Woman of CorinthIntroduction by episode producer David Susskind
|-
| Oct261959
| 1x02
| Burning Bright
| John Steinbeck
| Lewis FreedmanandHenry Weinstein
| Curt Conway
| Staged by Guthrie McClintic and produced by Rodgers and Hammerstein, Burning Bright opened on Broadway at the Broadhurst Theatre on October 18, 1950 and closed on October 28, after 13 performances.
starring Myron McCormick [first of five appearances on The Play of the Week] as Joe Saul, with Colleen Dewhurst as Mordeen, Dana Elcar as Ed and Donald Madden as Victor, Songs by Will HoltIntroduction by episode co-producer Lewis Freedman
|-
| Nov21959
| 1x03
| Back to Back:The Dock BriefandWhat Shall We Tell Caroline?
| John Mortimer
| David Susskind
| Stuart Burge
| Michael Hordern as Morgenhall and Tony Peters, George Rose as Fowle and Arthur Louden, Lueen McGrath as Bin, Jeane Marsh as Caroline
|-
| Nov91959
| 1x04
| A Month in the Country
| Ivan Turgenevtranslated byEmlyn Williams
| Lewis FreedmanandHenry Weinstein
| Marc Daniels
| Uta Hagen as Natalia Petrovna, Luther Adler as Ignaty Illyich Shpichelsky, Alexander Scourby as Rakitin, Richard Easton as Beliaev, Tim O'Connor as Yslaev, Olga Bellin as Vera
|-
| Nov161959
| 1x05
| The Waltz of the Toreadors
| Jean Anouilhtranslated byLucienne Hill
| David Susskind
| Stuart Burge
| Hugh Griffith as Général St. Pé, Mildred Natwick as Mme. St. Pé, Beatrice Straight as Mlle. de St. Euverte, John Abbott as Dr. Bonfant, Mary Grace Canfield as Sidonia, Jenny Egan as Estelle, Louise Kirtland as Mme. Dupont-Fredaine, James Valentine as Gaston
|-
| Nov191959
| 1x06
| The Power and the Glory
| Graham Greeneadapted byPierre Bostand Denis Cannan
| David Susskind
| Carmen Capalbo
| James Donald as Priest, Peter Falk as Mestizo, Ronald Long as Tench, Val Avery as Police Chief, Scotty McGregor as Maria, David J. Stewart as Governor's Cousin, John Alderson as Miguel, Alfred Ryder, Rudy Bond
|-
| Nov231959
| 1x07
| The White Steed
| Paul Vincent Carroll
| David Susskind
| Joseph Gistirak
| Frank Conroy as Canon Matt Lavelle, Tim O'Connor as Father Shaughnessy, Helena Carroll as Nora Fintry, Dermot McNamara as Denis Dillon, Roy Poole as Patrick Hearty, Pauline Flanagan as Sarah Hearty, Lester Rawlins as Toomey, Neil Fitzgerald as Fintry, Tom Clancy as Shivers
|-
| Nov301959
| 1x08
| Crime of Passion
| Jean-Paul Sartretranslated byLionel Abel
| David Susskind
| Stuart Burge
| Claude Dauphin as Hoederer, Donald Harron as Hugo, Betsy von Furstenberg as Jessica, Marian Seldes as Olga, Horace McMahon as Georges
|-
| Dec71959
| 1x09
| Simply Heavenly
| Langston Hughesmusic byDavid Martin
| David Susskind
| Joshua Shelley
| Melvin Stewart as Jesse P. Simple, Claudia McNeil as Mamie, Gail Fisher as Joyce Lane, Ethel Ayler as Zarita, Frederick O'Neal as Boyd, Earle Hyman as Hopkins
|-
| Dec141959
| 1x10
| The World of Sholom Aleichem
| Arnold PerlMusic bySerge HoveyandRobert de Cormier
| Producer for NTALewis FreedmanProduced byHenry T. Weinstein
| Don Richardson
| 1. "A Tale of Chelm"2. "Bontche Schweig — Based on a story by I. L. Peretz3. "The High School" — Based on a story by Sholom Aleichem
Starring Gertrude Berg, Sam Levene, Zero Mostel, Morris Carnovsky, Lee Grant and Nancy Walker as Rifkele, with Jack Gilford and in order of appearance Charlotte Rae, Elsa Freed, Henry Lascoe, Conrad Josephs, Frederick Rolf, Dora Weissman
|-
| Dec211959
| 1x11
| Thieves' Carnival
| Jean Anouilhtranslated byLucienne Hill 
| Lewis Freedman
| Warren EntersandRichard Dunlap
| [in alphabetical order] Larry Blyden as Hector, Tom Bosley as Dupont-Dufour Jr., Howard Da Silva as Dupont-Dufour Sr., Kurt Kasznar as Peterbono, Robert Morse as Gustave, Cathleen Nesbitt as Lady Hurf, Pat Stanley as Juliette, Frances Sternhagen as Eva
|-
| Dec281959
| 1x12
| The Cherry Orchard 
| Anton Chekhov
| David Susskind
| Daniel Petrie
| Helen Hayes as Madame Ranevskaya, E. G. Marshall as Lopakhin, Susan Strasberg as Anya, Salome Jens as Dunyasha, John Abbott as Gayev, Peggy McCay as Vary, Gerald Hiken as Trofimoff, Martin Wolfson as Semyonoff-Pishtchik, Paula Laurence as Carlotta Ivanova, Woodrow Parfrey as Epihodoff, Byron Russell as Fiers, Julian Battersby as Gardener
|-
| Jan41960
| 1x13
| The Closing Door
| Alexander Knox
| David Susskind
| Alexander KnoxandKarl Genus
| Staged by Lee Strasberg and produced by Cheryl Crawford, The Closing Door opened on Broadway at the Empire Theatre on December 1, 1949 and closed on December 17, after 22 performances. The playwright, Alexander Knox, had the leading role of Vail Trahern, and his wife, Doris Nolan, played Vail Trahern's wife, Norma.
Dane Clark as Vail Trahern, Kim Hunter as Norma Trahern, Arthur Hill as Doctor Ed Harriman, Kevin Coughlin as David Trahern, Katherine Squire as Grandma, George Segal as Don, John Randolph as Hector Trahern, Elizabeth Eustis as Connie
|-
| Jan111960
| 1x14
| The Emperor's Clothes 
| George Tabori
| Lewis Freedman
| Boris Sagal
| Viveca Lindfors as Belia Odry, Jules Munshin as Kossa, George Voskovec as Elek Odry, Sandor Szabo as the Baron, Charles Saari as Ferike, Tamara Daykarhanova, Peter Falk, Margit Fossgrin, David Hurst, Reuben Singer 
|-
|-
| Jan181960
| 1x15
| Lullaby
| Don Appell
| David Susskind
| Don Richardson
| Eli Wallach as Johnny Horton, Anne Jackson as Eadie Horton, Ruth White as Mother, Tom Carlin as the Bellboy
|-
| Jan251960
| 1x16
| Strindberg on Love:Miss JulieandThe Stronger
| August Strindbergtranslated byArvid Paulsenadapted byGeorge Tabori
| David Susskind
| Henry Kaplan
| Lois Smith as Julie, Robert Loggia as Gene, Patricia Neal as the Mistress, Nancy Wickwire as the Wife, Madeleine Sherwood as Kristin
|-
| Feb21960
| 1x17
| Juno and the Paycock
| Seán O'Casey
| David Susskind
| Paul Shyre
| Pauline Flanagan as Juno Boyle, Hume Cronyn as Captain Jack Boyle, Walter Matthau as Joxer Daly, Evans Evans as Mary Boyle, Luella Gear as Maisie Madigan, Liam Clancy as Johnny Boyle, Thomas A. Carlin as Jerry Devine, James Kenny as Charlie Bentham
|-
| Feb81960
| 1x18
| Tiger at the Gates
| Jean Giraudouxtranslated by Christopher Fry
| Robert L. JosephandHenry Weinstein
| Paul AlmondandHarold Clurman
| Directed by Harold Clurman and produced by Robert L. Joseph, Tiger at the Gates, the English-language title translator-playwright Christopher Fry chose for Jean Giraudoux's 1935 play La guerre de Troie n'aura pas lieu [The Trojan War Will Not Take Place] opened on Broadway at the Plymouth Theatre on October 3, 1955, transferred to the Helen Hayes Theatre on November 21, and closed on April 7, 1956, after 217 performances.
Donald Davis as Hector, Martin Gabel as Ulysses, Patricia Cutts as Helen, Nina Foch as Andromache, Arthur Treacher as Lawyer Busiris, Patrick Horgan as Paris, Leueen McGrath as Cassandra (Broadway cast [billed as Leueen MacGrath]), Cathleen Nesbitt as Hecuba, Mike Kellin as Ajax, Bramwell Fletcher as King Priam, David Hurst as Poet Propagandist, Milton Selzer as Mathematician (Broadway cast), Bill Howe
|-
| Feb151960
| 1x19
| Don Juan in Hell 
| George Bernard Shaw
| David Susskind
| Don Richardson
| [in alphabetical order] Marc Connelly as The Stage Manager, Hurd Hatfield as Don Juan, Dennis King as The Statue of the Commander, Siobhán McKenna as Dona Ana, George C. Scott as The Devil
|-
| Feb221960
| 1x20
| A Very Special Baby 
| Robert Alan Aurthur
| David Susskind
| Marc Daniels
| Oscar Homolka as Mr. Casale, Marion Winters as Anna Casale, Larry Blyden as Joey Casale
|-
| Feb291960
| 1x21
| The Climate of Eden 
| Moss Hartadapted fromEdgar Mittelholzer's 1951 novel
| David Susskind
| Moss Hart
| Staged by Moss Hart, who adapted it from Edgar Mittelholzer's British Guiana-set novel, Shadows Move Among Them, The Climate of Eden opened on Broadway at the Martin Beck Theatre on November 13, 1952 and closed on November 22, after 20 performances.
[in order of appearance] Donald Harron as Mr. Buckingham, Roland Culver as The Reverend Gerald Harmston, Diana Hyland as Mabel, Chuck Gordone as Logan, Lynn Loring as Olivia, Kevin Coughlin as Berton
|-
| Mar71960
| 1x22
| Volpone
| Ben Jonson
| Jack Kuney
| J. Robert BlumandGene Frankel
| [in alphabetical order] Ludwig Donath as Corbaccio, Alfred Drake as Mosca, Evans Evans as Colomba, Lou Jacobi as Corvino, Kurt Kasznar as Volpone, Art Smith as Voltore, Michael Tolan as Leone, Jo Van Fleet as Canina
|-
| Mar141960
| 1x23
| The Rope Dancers
| Morton Wishengrad
| David Susskind
| Peter Hall
| Directed by Peter Hall, The Rope Dancers opened on Broadway at the Cort Theatre on November 20, 1957, transferred to Henry Miller's Theatre on January 27, 1958 and closed on May 3, after 189 performances. At the 12th Tony Awards on April 13, 1958, The Rope Dancers was one of eight nominees for Best Play and Siobhán McKenna was among six nominees for Best Actress in a Play.
Siobhán McKenna as Margaret Hyland (Broadway cast), Walter Matthau as James Hyland, Audrey Christie as Mrs. Farrow, Jacob Ben-Ami as Dr. Jacobson, Frances Myers as Clementine (Broadway cast [credited as Barbara Ellen Myers]), Judy Sanford as Lizzie Hyland, Joseph Boland as Police Officer (Broadway cast)
|-
| Mar211960
| 1x24
| Henrick Ibsen'sThe Master Builder
| Henrik IbsenTranslated byEva Le Gallienne
| Executive ProducerDavid SusskindProduced byLewis Freedman
| John StixandRichard A. Lukin
| In London, two months after the December 1892 Norwegian publication of The Master Builder, the play received its first English-language production, with a translation by William Archer. The January 1900 American premiere in New York City was not at a Broadway theater, but in Carnegie Hall's Lyceum. 
Starring E. G. Marshall as Solness, Lois Smith as Hilde, Phyllis Love as Kaja, Fred Stewart as Dr. Herdal, Victor Kilian as Knut Brovik, James Patterson as Ragnar Brovik and Joanna Roos as Aline Solness
|-
| Mar281960
| 1x25
| The Grass Harp
| Truman Capote
| Jack Kuney
| Word Baker
| Directed by Robert Lewis, The Grass Harp opened on Broadway at the Martin Beck Theatre on March 27, 1952 and closed on April 26, after 36 performances.
Lillian Gish as Dolly Talbo, Carmen Mathews as Verena Talbo, Georgia Burke as Catherine Creek (Broadway cast), Russell Collins as Morris Ritz (Broadway cast [as Judge Charlie Cool]), Jonathan Harris as Amos Legrand (Broadway cast [as Dr. Morris Ritz]), Nick Hyams as Collin Talbo
|-
| Apr41960
| 1x26
| A Palm Tree in a Rose Garden
| Meade Roberts
| David Susskind
| Keve HjelmandWes Kenney
| Directed by Warren Enters, A Palm Tree in a Rose Garden opened Off-Broadway at the Cricket Theatre on November 26, 1957 and closed on January 19, 1958.
Glenda Farrell as Rose Frobisher, Barbara Ann Barrie as Lila Frobisher, Barbara Baxley as Barbara Parris (Off-Broadway cast), Robert Webber as Charlie Gordon
|-
| Apr111960
| 1x27
| The Enchanted
| Jean Giraudouxtranslated byMaurice Valency
| David Susskind
| Keve HjelmandWes Kenney
| Staged by George S. Kaufman, The Enchanted, playwright-critic Maurice Valency's English-language title for his 1950 translation of Jean Giraudoux's 1933 play Intermezzo, opened on Broadway at the Lyceum Theatre on January 18, 1950, and closed on February 25, after 45 performances.
[in alphabetical order] Walter Abel as Inspector, Joseph Buloff as Executioner, Cyril Cusack as Doctor, Mary Finney as Leonide Mangebois, Rosemary Harris as Isabel, James Mitchell as Ghost, Frances Lorrain Myers as Gilberte, Tom Poston as Supervisor, Frederick Rolf as Executioner, Joan Terrace as Lucy, Arthur Treacher as The Mayor, Nydia Westman as Armande Mangebois
|-
| Apr181960
| 1x28
| The Girls in 509
| Howard Teichmann
| David Susskind
| Keve HjelmandWes Kenney
| Staged by Bretaigne Windust, The Girls in 509 opened on Broadway at the Belasco Theatre on October 15, 1958 and closed on January 24, 1959, after 117 performances.
[in alphabetical order] Larry Blyden as Pusey, Parker Fennelly as Old Jim, Paul Ford as Winthrop Allen a/k/a Francis X. Nella, Margalo Gillmore as Aunt Hattie, John McGiver as Aubrey McKittridge, Nancy Walker as Mimsy
|-
| Apr251960
| 1x29
| Morning's at Seven
| Paul Osborn
| David Susskind
| Jack Ragotzy
| [in alphabetical order] Beulah Bondi as Mother, Russell Collins as Carl (1939–40 Broadway cast), Frank Conroy as David Crampton, 	Dorothy Gish as Aaronetta (1939–40 Broadway cast), Ann Harding as Cora, Eileen Heckart as Myrtle, Chester Morris as Swanson, Hiram Sherman as Homer Bolton, Ruth White as IdaIntermission interview hosted by Russel Crouse
|-
| May21960
| 1x30
| Night of the Auk
| Arch Oboler
| Lewis Freedman
| Nikos Psacharopoulos
| Based on Arch Oboler's radio play Rocket from Manhattan, Night of the Auk, directed by Sidney Lumet, opened on Broadway at the Playhouse Theatre on December 3, 1956 and closed on December 8, 1959, after 8 performances. The cast, in alphabetical order, was: Martin Brooks as Lt. Jan Kephart, Wendell Corey as Colonel Tom Russell, Christopher Plummer as Lewis Rohnen,	Claude Rains as Doctor Bruner, Dick York as Lt. Max Hartman. Three years after the TV production, another staging, at Off-Broadway's Cricket Theatre, lasted 3 performances, May 21–23, 1963.
[in alphabetical order] Warner Anderson as Col. Tom Russell, William Kerwin as John Custer, James MacArthur as Lieutenant Max Hartman, Alan Mixon as Lieutenant Jan Kephart, William Shatner as Lewis Rohnen, Shepperd Strudwick as Dr. Bruner, Luis Van Rooten as The President; Narrated by Raymond Edward Johnson
|-
| May91960
| 1x31
| A Piece of Blue Sky
| Frank Corsaro
| David Susskind
| Keve HjelmandWes Kenney
| Originally titled The Squirrel Cage, A Piece of Blue Sky, with its star, Shelley Winters, was produced by Jay Julian and directed by the author, Frank Corsaro, as a touring play which went into rehearsals on December 15, 1958 and, following three-and-a-half weeks of performances in regional theatre, was scheduled to open in New York City at the end of January 1959. The production folded, however, upon completion of its brief tour.
Shelley Winters as Kay, Gerald O'Loughlin as Al, Nancy Marchand as Margaret, Marian Seldes as Antonette, Morgan Sterne as Joe, Sudie Bond as Miserable
|-
| May161960
| 1x32
| Archy and Mehitabel
| Mel BrooksandJoe Darionadapted from Don Marquis' book The Life and Times of Archy and Mehitabelmusic byGeorge Kleinsinger
| Jack KuneyProducer for NTAWorthington Miner
| J. Robert BlumandEd Greenberg
| Titled Shinbone Alley and supervised by Sawyer Falk (original director Norman Lloyd requested the removal of his name from the credits), Archy and Mehitabel opened on Broadway at the Broadway Theatre on April 13, 1957 and closed on May 25, after 49 performances.
Eddie Bracken as Archy (Broadway cast), Tammy Grimes as Mehitabel, Jules Munshin as Tyrone T. Tattersall, Sondra Lee as Rusty, Michael Kermoyan as Big Bill, Joan Kruger, George Martin, John Smolko
|-
| May231960
| 1x33
| Mary Stuart
| Friedrich Schillertranslated by Jean Stock GoldstoneandJohn Reich
| David Susskind
| Dennis Vance
| Directed by Tyrone Guthrie, Mary Stuart opened off-Broadway at the Phoenix Theatre on October 8, 1957 and closed on November 24, after 56 performances.
Eva Le Gallienne as Queen Elizabeth (Broadway cast), Signe Hasso as Mary Stuart, John Colicos as Mortimer (Broadway cast), Staats Cotsworth as Burleigh, Patrick Waddington as Leicester, Paul Ballantyne as Shrewsbury, Muriel Kirkland as Hanna Kennedy, Philip Bourneuf as Paulet, David C. Jones as L'Aubespine
|-
| May301960
| 1x34
| The Grand Tour| Elmer Rice
| David Susskind
| William A. Graham
| Staged by the playwright, Elmer Rice, The Grand Tour opened on Broadway at the Martin Beck Theatre on December 10, 1951 and closed on December 15, after 8 performances.
Scott McKay as Ray Brinton, Audrey Meadows as Nell Valentine 
|-
| Jun71960
| 1x35
| The House of Bernarda Alba| Federico García Lorcatranslated by James Graham-LujanandRichard L. O'Connell
| David Susskind
| Keve HjelmandWes Kenney
| Directed by Boris Tumarin and Robert Breen, The House of Bernarda Alba opened on Broadway at the ANTA Playhouse on January 7, 1951 and closed on January 20, after 17 performances.
Anne Revere as Bernarda Alba, Lee Grant as Amelia, Cathleen Nesbitt as Martirio, Nancy Marchand as Margareta, Suzanne Pleshette as Adela, Eileen Heckart as PonciaThomas Gomez and Michael Tolan read selections from García Lorca's poetry after the play's conclusion
|}

Season 2 (1960–61)
 Henry IV by William Shakespeare; in the cast: Donald Davis as Henry IV, Stephen Joyce as Prince Hal, Donald Madden as Hotspur, Eric Berry as Falstaff and Nan Martin as Lady Percy (September 26, 1960)
 The Dybbuk adapted by Joseph Liss; directed by Sidney Lumet; in the cast: Ludwig Donath, Carol Lawrence, Michael Tolan, Theodore Bikel and Vincent Gardenia (October 3, 1960)
 Legend of Lovers by Jean Anouilh; adapted by Kitty Black; directed by Ralph Nelson; cast: Piper Laurie, Robert Loggia, Sam Jaffe, Michael Constantine and Polly Rowles (October 10, 1960)
 The Velvet Glove by Rosemary Casey; in the cast: Helen Hayes, Robert Morse, Arthur Shields, Larry Gates and Collin Wilcox (October 17, 1960)
 Duet for Two Hands by Mary Hayley Bell; cast: Signe Hasso, Eric Portman, Patrick Horgan and Lois Nettleton (October 24, 1960)
 Seven Times Monday by Ernest Pendrell; directed by Wes Kenney; in the cast: Ossie Davis, Ruby Dee, Rosetta LeNoire, William Windom and Warren Berlinger (October 31, 1960)
 Two by Saroyan—"Once Around the Block" and "My Heart's in the Highlands" by William Saroyan; in the cast: Walter Matthau, Orson Bean, Myron McCormick, Larry Hagman and Eddie Hodges (November 7, 1960)
 The Iceman Cometh by Eugene O'Neill; directed by Sidney Lumet; introduced by Brooks Atkinson; in the cast: Jason Robards as Hickey, Farrell Pelly as Harry Hope, Robert Redford as Don Parritt, Myron McCormick as Larry Slade and Julie Bovasso as Pearl (Part I—November 14, 1960)
 The Iceman Cometh (Part II—November 21, 1960)
 Highlights of New Faces by Leonard Sillman; in the cast: Robert Clary, Alice Ghostley, Ronny Graham, Paul Lynde and Inga Swenson (November 28, 1960)
 Uncle Harry by Thomas Job; in the cast: Ray Walston, Betty Field, Jeff Donnell, Sylvia Miles and John Zacherle (December 5, 1960)
 Rashomon – December 12, 1960
 Emmanuel – December 19, 1960
 A Clearing in the Woods – January 2, 1961
 The Potting Shed – January 9, 1961
 Black Monday – January 16, 1961
 New York Scrapbook – January 23, 1961
 He Who Gets Slapped – January 20, 1961
 Four by Tennessee – February 6, 1961
 The Sound of Murder – February 13, 1961
 Night of the Auk – February 20, 1961
 No Exit and The Indifferent Lover – February 27, 1961
 The Old Foolishness – March 6, 1961
 Thérèse Raquin – March 13, 1961
 The Wooden Dish – March 20, 1961
 A Cool Wind Over the Living – March 27, 1961
 Waiting for Godot by Samuel Beckett; in the cast: Zero Mostel as Estragon and Burgess Meredith as Vladimir (April 3, 1961)
 In a Garden – April 10, 1961
 The Wingless Victory – April 17, 1961
 Close Quarters – April 24, 1961
 All Summer Long'' – May 1, 1961

References

External links

The Play of the Week at TV Guide

1959 American television series debuts
1961 American television series endings
1950s American anthology television series
1960s American anthology television series
1950s American television specials
1960s American television specials
1950s American drama television series
1960s American drama television series
American television films
Black-and-white American television shows
English-language television shows
Peabody Award-winning television programs
Television shows based on plays